J. Edward Fox (born December 1, 1948) is a United States official who has served in the United States Department of State and the United States Department of Homeland Security.

Biography

J. Edward Fox was born in Columbus, Ohio.  He was educated at Ohio State University, receiving a bachelor's degree in political science, and at George Washington University, receiving a master's degree in Legislative Affairs.

Fox began his career on Capitol Hill, where he worked on the personal staff of two members of the United States Congress.  He later served on the professional staff of the United States House Committee on Foreign Affairs, as a specialist on the subcommittees on Asia, Africa, and Latin America.

In 1985, Fox moved to the White House as Special Assistant to the President for Legislative Affairs.  The next year, President of the United States Ronald Reagan nominated Fox as Assistant Secretary of State for Legislative Affairs in 1986, and Fox held this office from June 18, 1986, until February 21, 1989.

Fox left government service in 1989, joining Mintz, Levin, Cohn, Ferris, Glovsky, and Popeo as Managing Director of Mintz, Levin's Governmental and International Affairs Group.  He also formed his own consulting firm, Fox & Associates.

After eleven years at Mintz, Levin, Fox returned to the government in 1989, being sworn in as Assistant Administrator of the United States Agency for International Development's Bureau for Legislative and Public Affairs on November 6, 2001.  In April 2007, United States Secretary of Homeland Security Michael Chertoff appointed Fox Assistant Secretary of Homeland Security for Public Affairs.

Personal life
Fox is married with three adult children, Abigail, Katharine and James Edward III.

References

Biography from USAID
Press Release Announcing Appointment of Fox as Assistant Secretary of Homeland Security (Public Affairs)

United States Assistant Secretaries of State
Living people
People from Columbus, Ohio
Ohio State University College of Arts and Sciences alumni
The Graduate School of Political Management alumni
United States Department of Homeland Security officials
1948 births
Mintz Levin people